Yeh Dil Sun Raha Hai (English: This Heart Is Listening) is an Indian soap opera, produced by Ekta Kapoor under the banner Balaji Telefilms. The show stars Aparna Dixit and Navi Bhangu. The show premiered on 16 October 2014 on Sony Pal.

Plot
Yeh Dil Sun Raha Hai is an intense love story of two lovers set in Patna, Bihar who are destined to never come together. Purvi is an educated and a highly moralistic individual and the daughter of two IAS officers. Arjun is everything she despises - uncouth, uneducated, sexist and son of Baccha Yadav, a political goon. The show explores the love story of Poorvi and Arjun who study in the same college. The show brings Poorvi and Arjun somewhere together where they fall in love only to be separated later by luck.

Cast
 Aparna Dixit as Purvi
 Navi Bhangu as Arjun Singh
 Priyanka Purohit as Gauri
 Aarti Shah as Preetika Choudhary
 Roopa Ganguly as Neelima Shankar Dayal
 Kali Prasad Mukherjee as Bachcha Singh
 Seema Pandey as Arjun's Mother
 Nikhil Arya as Dr Watan Bachcha Singh
 Manraj Singh as Mrigank
 Akanksha Juneja as Tanushree 
 Aadesh Chaudhary as Viraj Raichand
 Alok Narula as Naksh Shankar Dayal
 Rujut Dahiya as Vatan's brother
 Preeti Chaudhary as Sonia
 Adaa Khan as Pia

References

External links

 Production Website at BalajiTelefilms.com

Balaji Telefilms television series
2014 Indian television series debuts
Indian television soap operas
Serial drama television series
Television shows set in Bihar
2015 Indian television series endings
Sony Pal original programming